Leo Pleysier (b. Rijkevorsel, 28 May 1945) is a Belgian writer.

Bibliography
 Mirliton, een proeve van homofonie (1971) 
 Niets dan schreeuw (1972) 
 Negenenvijftig (1975) 
 Bladschaduwen (1976) 
 En wat zullen we over het sterven zeggen? (1976) 
 Het jaar van het dorp, of De razernij der winderige dagen (1977) 
 Vlaanderen '77 (1977) 
 De weg naar Kralingen (1860–1980) (1981) 
 Inpakken en wegwezen (1983) 
 Kop in kas (1983) 
 Shimmy (1987) 
 Wit is altijd schoon (1989) 
 De kast (1991) 
 De Gele Rivier is bevrozen (1993) 
 Zwart van het volk (1996) 
 Volgend jaar in Berchem (2000)
 De dieven zijn al gaan slapen (2003)
 De trousse (2004)
 De Latino's (2007)
 Dieperik (2010)
 De zoon, de maan en de sterren (2014)
 Familiealbum (2015)
 Heel de tijd (2018)

Awards
 1984 - Arkprijs van het Vrije Woord for Kop in Kas 
 1990 - Ferdinand Bordewijk Prijs for Wit is altijd schoon
 1996 - Belgische Staatsprijs voor Proza

See also
 Flemish literature

Sources
 Leo Pleysier

1945 births
Flemish writers
Living people
Ferdinand Bordewijk Prize winners
Ark Prize of the Free Word winners